This is a list of electoral district results for the 1998 Queensland state election.

Results by electoral district

Albert

Archerfield

Ashgrove

Aspley

Barambah

Barron River

Beaudesert

Brisbane Central

Broadwater

Bulimba

Bundaberg

Bundamba

Burdekin

Burleigh

Burnett

Caboolture

Cairns

Callide

Caloundra

Capalaba

Charters Towers

Chatsworth

Chermside

Clayfield

Cleveland

Cook

Crows Nest

Cunningham

Currumbin

Everton

Ferny Grove

Fitzroy

Gladstone

Greenslopes

Gregory

Gympie

Hervey Bay

Hinchinbrook

Inala

Indooroopilly

Ipswich

Ipswich West

Kallangur

Kedron

Keppel

Kurwongbah

Lockyer

Logan

Lytton

Mackay

Mansfield

Maroochydore

Maryborough

Merrimac 
The results for Merrimac were:

Mirani

Moggill

Mooloolah 
The results for Moolooah were:

Mount Coot-tha

Mount Gravatt

Mount Isa

Mount Ommaney

Mulgrave

Mundingburra

Murrumba

Nerang 
The results for Nerang were:

Nicklin

Noosa

Nudgee

Redcliffe

Redlands

Rockhampton

Sandgate

South Brisbane

Southport

Springwood

Sunnybank

Surfers Paradise

Tablelands

Thuringowa

Toowoomba North

Toowoomba South

Townsville

Warrego

Warwick 
The results for Warwick were:

Waterford

Western Downs 
The results for Western Downs were:

Whitsunday

Woodridge

Yeronga 
The results for Yeronga were:

See also 

 1998 Queensland state election
 Members of the Queensland Legislative Assembly, 1995–1998
 Members of the Queensland Legislative Assembly, 1998–2001
 Candidates of the Queensland state election, 1998

References 

Results of Queensland elections